Tomáš Kubíček (born 29 July 1962) is a Czech fencer. He competed in the team épée event at the 1992 Summer Olympics.

References

1962 births
Living people
Czech male fencers
Czechoslovak male fencers
Olympic fencers of Czechoslovakia
Fencers at the 1992 Summer Olympics
Sportspeople from Karlovy Vary